Behera(is a hill town and Gram Panchayat of Dharamgarh Tehsil. It is 20 km from Dharamgarh and 14 km  from Athara-Nala forest. Behera Dam is situated nearby which is 18 km from the village. This small hill town is surrounded by forests and is situated nearly to a very well known tourist place Dokrichanchra of Kalahandi. Behera is 65 km distance from its District Main City Bhawanipatna, and 560 km distance from its State Capital Bhubaneswar.

Demographics 

As of the 2011 Census of India, Total Population of Behera was 6,948, where it constitutes 52% of male and 48%  female.
Behera had a total literacy population of 5,947, from which male literacy 90% and female literacy 60%. Total SC population of this  town was 1526 and Total ST population was 2246. As per census 2011 it is estimated that the population of Behera is near about  6948.

Written and spoken languages 
The chief communicative language of the village is  Sambalpuri Odia. English and Odia are used for official purpose.

Education

Schools 
 Govt.Danteswari High School, Behera
 Govt.U.P and M.E Nodal School
 Tandapara U.P School
 Saraswati Sishu Vidya Mandir
 Kasturaba Gandhi Abasika Balika Vidyalaya
 G.M Public School
 Govt Primary School Bankimunda, Behera
 Bharuamunda Primary School, Behera
 Primary School Gaintapada, Behera
 Centre Primary School, Nunpani, Behera
 Primary School (New) Pipalpada Behera

Colleges 
 Lakhiram Agrawal College

Hospitals nearby 
Primary Health Centre, Behera
 Office Of The Assistant Veterinary surgeon, Behera
 Homeopathy Hospital Behera
 Sub health centre Behera

Temples 
Goddess Danteswari Temple
Lord Shiva Temple
Lord Jagannath Temple
Sri Budharaja Temple
Hanuman Temple
 Manpuriani Temple Behera
 Sarbajanina Durga Mandap.

Arts 

Ghumura
Rahas
Madal
Sankirtan
Banabadi

Views

Cultivation 
Generally in Behera, many kinds of cereal and pulses are cultivated, mainly paddy and maize. It is a market place for surrounding small villages, and is also one of the main grain collection centers in Kalahandi District. Most people are dependent on agriculture as their source of income. Two rice mills are situated here to process the paddy. Rice is the main grain which is cultivated in this area. Nearly 2 lakh quintals of paddy and one lakh quintals of maize are collected and produced here. Chidanand Rice Mill is located in Behera. It has 3 sortex rice mills and 2 Plane rice mills.  Panigrahi Farm House is located nearby Behera.

References 

Cities and towns in Kalahandi district